Sofa Surfers is an Austrian band that plays a mixture of rock and electronic music floating between trip hop, dub and acid jazz. They have also composed film scores.

Members 
Markus Kienzl
Wolfgang Frisch
Michael Holzgruber
Mani Obeya
Several guests cooperated on the album Encounters - for example Sensational, Oddateee, Jeb Loy Nichols, DJ Collage, Lil Desmond Levy, Junior Delgado, Dawna Lee, Mark Stewart and MC Santana. On the album called Sofa Surfers sings Mani Obeya.

Discography 
1997 Transit
1999 Cargo
2000 Constructions: Remixed & Dubbed
2002 Encounters
2004 See the Light
2005 Sofa Surfers
2010 Blindside
2012 Superluminal
2015 Scrambles, Anthems and Odysseys
2017 20

Soundtracks:
2000 Komm, süßer Tod
2004 Silentium
2009 Der Knochenmann
2014 Das ewige Leben
2015 Focus

External links 

 
 Review
 Sofa Surfers on Allmusic

Trip hop groups
Austrian alternative rock groups